Bicuspidella is a genus of green algae in the class Chlorophyceae. Its taxonomy is uncertain.

References

Chlorophyceae genera